Uranium monophosphide is a compound of uranium and phosphorus.

Synthesis
Heating metal uranium and white phosphorus:
4U + P4->4UP

Further reading

Uranium(III) compounds
Phosphides
Rock salt crystal structure